Pat White was a New Zealand rugby league footballer who represented New Zealand. His brother, Jim, also played for New Zealand.

Playing career
White and his brother played for the Marist club in the Canterbury Rugby League competition. He represented both Canterbury and the South Island.

White represented New Zealand Schoolboys in 1954 and in 1962 played for New Zealand Māori.

White played in three test matches for the New Zealand national rugby league team in 1964 against France, scoring one try.

References

New Zealand rugby league players
New Zealand Māori rugby league players
New Zealand Māori rugby league team players
New Zealand national rugby league team players
Canterbury rugby league team players
Rugby league wingers
South Island rugby league team players
Place of birth missing (living people)
Year of birth missing (living people)
Living people